The men's 100 meter running deer, single and double shot event was a shooting sports event held as part of the shooting programme of the 1956 Summer Olympics. It was the second and last appearance of the event. The competition was held on 3 and 4 December 1956 at the shooting ranges in Melbourne. 11 shooters from 6 nations competed.

Results

References

Shooting at the 1956 Summer Olympics
100 meter running deer at the Olympics